Maria Vigeland (13 March 1903 – 8 August 1983) was a Norwegian painter and sculptor.

Biography
She was born in Copenhagen. She was the daughter of Emanuel Vigeland and niece of Gustav Vigeland.  She attended the Norwegian National Academy of Craft and Art Industry  where he studied  under Eivind Nielsen 1920-25 and under Olaf Willums 1928–29. She was trained at the Norwegian National Academy of Fine Arts  under Wilhelm Rasmussen in 1930. She later attended École des Beaux-Arts in Paris where she trained under Lucien Simon.

Her religious interests led her to decorating churches and making monuments. In her early years, she studied art in France and Italy. The studies would have particular significance for her stained glass.
Vigeland decorated several burial chapels in Oslo, a crematorium in Drammen, an altarpiece and several pictures for Bredtveit Prison. She designed stained glass at  various sites including Lovisenberg Church in the district of St. Hanshaugen in Oslo. 

Her bronze statues Piken med fuglen (1953) is in Gunnarsbøparken and Piken med sjøpinnsvinet (1954) is on Camilla Colletts vei both in Tønsberg. She also designed the bronze monument Hvilende kvinne (1971) at Østre Aker Cemetery at Ulven in Oslo.

References 

1903 births
1983 deaths
Artists from Oslo
Oslo National Academy of the Arts alumni
École des Beaux-Arts alumni
20th-century Norwegian sculptors
20th-century Norwegian painters
Norwegian women sculptors